Qarmoutus hitanensis is an extinct ariid catfish whose fossils were first discovered in Wadi Al-Hitan, Egypt. It lived during the Eocene period around 37 million years ago, and its body length is estimated to be about 6.5 feet long.

References

Giant Catfish Fossil Found in Egyptian Desert, National Geographic

Eocene fish
Eocene animals of Africa
Fossil taxa described in 2017
Ariidae